The Holt-Dern process is method by which silver and gold can be extracted from low-grade ores.

The method was applied in mining at Park City, Utah and in the Tintic Mining District, specifically at the Tintic Smelter Site.

It was named for George Dern and T.P. Holt.

References

Chemical processes
Mining techniques
Smelting